Lycorea is a genus of butterflies from the family Nymphalidae found in Mexico, Central America, and South America.

Species
Listed alphabetically.
Lycorea halia (Hübner, 1816) – tropical milkweed butterfly
Lycorea ilione (Cramer, [1775]) – clearwing mimic queen
Lycorea pasinuntia (Stoll, [1780]) – pasinuntia mimic queen

References

Danaini
Nymphalidae of South America
Nymphalidae genera
Taxa named by Edward Doubleday